is a railway station in the city of Motosu, Gifu Prefecture, Japan operated by the private railway operator Tarumi Railway.

Lines

Station layout
Midori Station has one ground-level side platform serving a single bi-directional track. The station is unattended.

Adjacent stations

|-
!colspan=5|Tarumi Railway

History
Midori Station opened on March 25, 1989.

Surrounding area

See also
 List of Railway Stations in Japan

References

External links

 

Railway stations in Gifu Prefecture
Railway stations in Japan opened in 1989
Stations of Tarumi Railway
Motosu, Gifu